The 2019 Antenna Awards were held on 5 October 2019 at the Deakin Edge at Federation Square in Melbourne. The ceremony was announced on 4 July 2019, and recognised excellence in Australian community television of the eligibility period, running between 1 July 2014 and 30 June 2019. 

It was hosted by comedian and former Live on Bowen presenter Dilruk Jayasinha. The ceremony was broadcast live from 8:00pm AEST on C31 Melbourne, Channel 44 Adelaide and WTV Perth, and was streamed live on Facebook. On 9 October, the ceremony was made available to stream on YouTube.

Awards were presented in 24 categories. Program of the Year was awarded to The Leak with Pat McCaffrie, while Personality of the Year was awarded to Emmylou Loves presenter Emmylou McCarthy. A special award, the Stella Young Contribution to Community TV Award, was presented to Nimal Alwis.

This was the 9th Antenna Awards ceremony – the first since 2014 – and marked 25 years since the first broadcast of C31 Melbourne. Nominations were accepted from producers of programs that aired on terrestrial community television – including the now-defunct Television Sydney and 31 Brisbane – as well as satellite and cable channels Aurora and ICTV.

Performers

Winners and nominees

References

External links
 Official website
 

 09
2019 television awards
2019 in Australian television
Australian community television
2010s in Melbourne